Opuntia invicta is a native cactus endemic to lower elevations in Baja California, Mexico.

References

invicta
Cacti of Mexico
Flora of Baja California
Endemic flora of Mexico